Anna may refer to:

People

Surname and given name
 Anna (name)

Mononym
 Anna the Prophetess, in the Gospel of Luke
 Anna (wife of Artabasdos) (fl. 715–773)
 Anna (daughter of Boris I) (9th–10th century)
 Anna (Anisia) (fl. 1218 to 1221)
 Anna of Poland, Countess of Celje (1366–1425)
 Anna of Cilli (1386–1416)
 Anna, Grand Duchess of Lithuania (died 1418)
 Anne of Austria, Landgravine of Thuringia (1432–1462)
 Anna of Nassau-Dillenburg (died 1514)
 Anna, Duchess of Prussia (1576–1625)
 Anna of Russia (1693–1740)
 Anna, Lady Miller (1741–1781)
 Anna Russell, Duchess of Bedford (1783–1857)
 Anna, Lady Barlow (1873–1965)
 Anna (feral child) (1932–1942)
 Anna (singer) (born 1987)

Places

Australia
 Hundred of Anna, a cadastral district in South Australia

Iran
 Anna, Fars, a village in Fars Province
 Anna, Kohgiluyeh and Boyer-Ahmad, a village in Kohgiluyeh and Boyer-Ahmad Province

Russia
 Anna, Voronezh Oblast, an urban locality in Voronezh Oblast
 Anna, Russia, a list of inhabited localities

United States
 Anna, Arkansas
 Anna, Georgia
 Anna, Kentucky
 Anna, Illinois
 Anna, Ohio
 Anna, Texas
 Lake Anna, Virginia

Other places
 Anna, Estonia, a village in Paide Parish, Järva County, Estonia
 Anna (Iraq), a former name of Anah in Iraq
 Anna, Latvia, a village in the Alūksne District, Latvia
 Anna, Valencia, Spain
 Anna Cave, a natural limestone cave in Miskolc-Lillafüred, Hungary
 Anna River (disambiguation)
 Anna Valley, a village in Hampshire, UK
 Anna Paulowna, a municipality and town in the Netherlands
 Anna Regina, the capital of the Pomeroon-Supenaam Region of Guyana
 Anna Salai, an arterial road in Chennai, India

Art and media

Film
 Anna (1951 film), Italian film directed by Alberto Lattuada
 Anna (1964 film), Indian Malayalam film directed by K. S. Sethumadhavan
 Anna (1967 film), French film starring Anna Karina
 Anna (1970 film), Finnish film starring Harriet Andersson
 Anna (1987 film), American film about a Czech actress in New York City
 Anna, a 1988 film script-supervised by Mary Cybulski
 Anna (1994 film), Indian Telugu film directed by Muthyala Subbaiah starring Rajasekhar, Roja and Gauthami
 Anna (2013 film), a psychological thriller that was originally released as Mindscape
 Anna (2015 Canadian film)
 Anna (2015 Colombian film)
 Anna (2016 film), an Indian film based on the life of Anna Hazare
 Anna (2019 feature film), a French film by Luc Besson
 Anna (2019 short film), a live-action short film
 Anna: 6 - 18, 1993 documentary by Nikita Mikhalkov

Television
 Anna (German TV series), a 1987 German television series
 Anna (Italian TV series), a 2021 Italian television series
 Anna (South Korean TV series), a 2022 South Korean television series

Literature
 Anna (magazine), a defunct weekly Italian women's fashion magazine
 Anna (Finnish magazine)
 Anna, a novel by Niccolò Ammaniti

Music
 Anna Records, early Motown label
 ANNA (band), a Ukrainian nu-metal band
 Anna (Anna Waronker album), 2002
 Anna (The Courteeners album), 2013
 "Anna" (The Cribs song)
 "Anna (Go to Him)", a 1962 song by Arthur Alexander, later covered by The Beatles
 "Anna", a 2015 song by Will Butler from Policy
 "Anna", a 2011 song by Charlotte Gainsbourg from Stage Whisper
 "Anna", a 1984 song by APO Hiking Society from Feet on the Ground
 "Anna", a 1975 song by Bad Company from Straight Shooter
 "Anna", a 1970 song by Lucio Battisti
 "Anna", a song by Toto from The Seventh One
 "Anna", a song by Stone Sour from Audio Secrecy

Other arts and media
 For characters named Anna; see Anna (name)
 Anna (Frozen), a character in the 2013 Disney animated film Frozen
 Anna (video game), a 2012 psychological horror game
 An early name for Morgause of Arthurian legend
 The sister of Dido, Queen of Carthage, in Roman mythology and later literature

Science
 Anna (apple), a cultivar of domesticated apple
 Anna (dog), first survivor of experimental pulmonary bypass surgery
 Anna (gastropod), a genus of sea snails
 Anna (plant), a genus of flowering plants in the family Gesneriaceae

Vehicles
 Anna (ship), a 1739 merchant vessel
 Anna (1790 ship) or Bombay Anna, a British East India Company (EIC) ship
 Anna (1793 ship) or Bengal Anna, a British East India Company (EIC) ship
 Anna (1912 automobile), a defunct automobile of unknown origin
 , a 1940 Kriegsmarine coastal tanker

Other uses
 , a Japanese era from 968 to 970
 Anna University, an engineering university with a number of affiliates in Tamil Nadu, India
 Abkhazian Network News Agency, a news agency in the breakaway Abkhazian Republic
 Indian anna, a currency unit formerly used in India
 Pommes Anna, or Anna potatoes, a classic French potato dish
 Anna (goddess), the main deity in Old Assyrian Kanesh

See also
 , including many people with forename Anna
 
 Anni (disambiguation)
 Ann (disambiguation)
 Anne (disambiguation)
 Annie (disambiguation)
 Annah (disambiguation)
 Anya, a given name
 Hannah (name), a given name
 Santa Ana (disambiguation)